Tom & Thomas (UK title: The Christmas Twins) is a 2002 British family film directed by Esmé Lammers and starring Aaron Johnson and Sean Bean. The film was released on 24 January 2002 in the Netherlands.

Plot
Sean Bean stars as the caring single adoptive father of one of a set of identical twins — played by Aaron Johnson — separated years earlier. The film follows the two boys as they meet, and having come to the attention of a corrupt orphanage manager are instrumental in smashing a child smuggling ring. After the two boys meet they have fun until Thomas is kidnapped by the child smugglers. They keep him bound with belts in a warehouse and use drugs to keep him asleep. The smugglers plan to transport Thomas to another country in a plane by smuggling him off as an animal in a box where he is kept bound and gagged (with belts and tape). Tom learns of this however and comes to Thomas' rescue.

Locations
Tom & Thomas was filmed on the following locations:
 London Southbank (UK), scene were the two boys mock about throwing snowballs.
 Notting Hill (UK), where Sean Bean and Aaron Johnson get in the car.
 Haarlem (NL), is where the Thomas' school scenes were shot.
 Amstelveen (NL), is where Tom and Thomas obtain their corduroy denim jacket with orange hooded sweaters. Amsterdam RAI (NL), was turned into Heathrow departures.
 Noordwijk (NL), was where the museum scenes were made.
 Gent (B), that's where the orphanage scenes were shot.
 Schiphol airport, where Transavia allowed the crew to use their hangar.

Casting 
Tom & Thomas gained initial media interest through its illusive casting auditions. The auditions took place across the UK and the Netherlands, and resulted in a final casting session held in London, UK. The eventual winners were Tom and Alex Dawes, twins from the Midlands who are more generally known for their guest appearance in Nickelodeon's TV adaptation of Jacqueline Wilson's Double Act. However, after being accepted for the roles, the pair were rejected in favour of Johnson as loss of funding cut the cast in half. After a brief conflict between the Dawes twins and Lammers, which resulted in the pair gaining UK rights to the title "Tom & Thomas", the matter was settled with an undisclosed settlement. The Dawes twins have not been involved in any acting since, and now both hold positions at the University of Oxford.

External links 
 
 

2002 films
Dutch drama films
2002 drama films
British drama films
2000s English-language films
2000s British films